Hugra union is a village of Tangail sadar tangailof Tangail District in the Division of dhaka, Bangladesh. It stands on the river Hura-shagar. Many of the villagers are service-holders and have migrated to towns for that. There are a number of educational institutions here.

References

Populated places in Rajshahi Division
Sirajganj District